Pollux is a mountain in the Pennine Alps on the border between Valais, Switzerland and the Aosta Valley in Italy. It is the lower of a pair of twin peaks, the other being Castor, named after the Gemini twins of Roman mythology.

The first ascent was by Jules Jacot from Geneva with guides Josef-Marie Perren and Peter Taugwalder (father) on August 1 (the Swiss national day) 1864. Their route was via the Schwarztor, a pass first crossed by John Ball and Gabriel Zumtaugwald in 1845. The impressive north ridge was first climbed by Captain John Percy Farrar (a future President of the Alpine Club) and Wylie Lloyd with guide Josef Pollinger of St. Niklaus in the canton Valais on 18 August 1893.

Ascents are usually made from the Refuge Ottorino Mezzalama (3,036 m), the Monte Rosa hut (2,795 m); if traversing the peaks via Pollux's north ridge, PD+, the Refuge Quintino Sella au Félik (3,585 m), and the Rossi-Volante bivouac hut (3,850 m).

The first winter and ski ascent of Pollux was by Dr Alfred von Martin and Karl Planck on 7 March 1913.

See also

List of 4000 metre peaks of the Alps

References
 Collomb, Robin G., (ed.), Pennine Alps Central, London: Alpine Club, 1975
 Dumler, Helmut and Willi P. Burkhardt, The High Mountains of the Alps, London: Diadem, 1994. (Dumler gives Pollux's elevation as 4,091 m.)

External links
 Pollux on SummitPost
 Photo essay on climbing and skiing Pollux in April 2008

Alpine four-thousanders
Mountains of the Alps
Mountains of Italy
Mountains of Valais
Pennine Alps
Italy–Switzerland border
International mountains of Europe
Mountains of Switzerland
Four-thousanders of Switzerland